Anwar Hared (born November 17, 1996) is a Somali-Canadian ice hockey and bandy player. He played in the 2014 Bandy World Championship and scored the first ever goal for Somalia team, scoring in total two goals.

Hared was also included in the Somalia team which competes at the 2015 Bandy World Championship in Khabarovsk. Somalia lost the first game, to the Netherlands, 0–18. However, being interviewed after the game, he mentioned that he was disappointed with the result, but the game itself was pleasant.
He scored a goal in the game against China, becoming the only Somali player to score in two World Championships.

Hared immigrated with his family to Canada and lived there for more than 15 years. He learned about Somalia national bandy team browsing internet, and after getting specific training for bandy on roller skates for three months, and on skates for further two months, he joined the team. He lives in Newmarket and usually plays ice hockey for the Aurora Tigers.

References

Somalian emigrants to Canada
Black Canadian ice hockey players
Bandy players
Expatriate bandy players in Canada
1996 births
Living people
Place of birth missing (living people)
Sportspeople from Newmarket, Ontario